James Spagnola (July29, 1939 – May8, 2004), known as Jim Spagg, was an American artist and host of a controversial public-access television cable TV program in Portland, Oregon, United States, from 1991 to 2003.

Spagg was born and raised in Cleveland, Ohio, and attended Catholic school.

Public-access television program 
In the early 1990s, Spagg attracted local and national media attention with Jim Spagg's Sex Show, a call-in cable TV program that contained uncensored nudity. Spagg, a nudist, produced and directed the program and frequently appeared without clothing. The show was mostly improvised, and often consisted of little more than Spagg dancing nude while playing a guitar and singing. The show sometimes included nude guests, and often contained footage filmed at Rooster Rock State Park, a clothing-optional public beach near Portland. Several episodes focused on Spagg's petty feuds with his neighbor Ed DeKota.

Spagg's premises were
 nudity is not dirty; and
 people are too busy and too serious.

Spagg denied that his program was lewd, claiming that "I am an artist and I'm expressing myself through video."

Spagg also swore throughout and showed himself defecating.

In May 2003, after nearly 11 years on the air, Jim Spagg's Sex Show was removed by Portland Cable Access (PCA) after Spagg defecated live on the show. He was suspended for a year; the official reason given was broadcasting copyrighted material, violating the public-access channel's broadcast standards. The copyrighted material in question was a series of clips filmed by PCA itself with on-the-street testimony about PCA.

"He simply took property and used it as his own, against our rules and federal law," says Carl Kucharski, PCA's executive director.

Public reaction and media attention 
The Portland-area public often found Spagg's public-access show while flipping through cable TV channels. His show elicited complaints from viewers, particularly those with children, who were upset that his program ran during the day. Despite public outcry to remove his program from PCA, it was not possible due to freedom of speech protection for public-access programming. Spagg frequently defended his program as art, and appeared on KATU's Town Hall program, where he defended his right to appear nude on television as freedom of speech. He was also featured on the national television news show A Current Affair.

Jim Spagg died of leukemia on May8, 2004, at the age of 64 in Portland. At the time, he was running for mayor of the city. He received several hundred votes.

References

External links 
 

1939 births
2004 deaths
Burials at Willamette National Cemetery
Deaths from leukemia
Artists from Cleveland
Television personalities from Portland, Oregon
Social nudity advocates
United States Marines
American public access television personalities
Nudity in television